Podalonia hirsuta is a species of parasitoidal wasps in the family Sphecidae.

Subspecies
 Podalonia hirsuta hirsuta (Scopoli, 1763) 
 Podalonia hirsuta mervensis (Radoszkowski, 1887)

Description
Podalonia hirsuta is similar to the sand wasps (Ammophila). It has a big black head, a black thorax, with a threadlike waist (petiole). The abdomen is black with a red-orange large band.

The females make their nests digging a burrow in a sandy area. The preys are generally large, hairless caterpillars of moths (Noctuidae). In the paralysed caterpillars they lay their eggs.

Flight period extends from late March to mid-September in females, while males fly from June to September.

Distribution and habitat
This species is present in most of Europe. This mainly coastal species commonly can be found in sandy soils.

References

Sphecidae
Insects described in 1763
Taxa named by Giovanni Antonio Scopoli